Loggerhead or Loggerheads may refer to:

Places
 Loggerheads, Denbighshire, a village in Denbighshire, Wales
 Loggerheads, Staffordshire, a small village in north Staffordshire, England
 Loggerhead Key, the largest islet in the Dry Tortugas, Florida
 Loggerheads and Whitmore ward, a ward in the borough of Newcastle-under-Lyme, England
 Loggerhead Park, a 17-acre recreational area in Juno Beach, Florida with a beach

Fauna and flora
 Loggerhead sea turtle, the sea turtle Caretta caretta
 Loggerhead musk turtle, the turtle Sternotherus minor
 Loggerhead kingbird, the passerine bird Tyrannus caudifasciatus
 Loggerhead shrike, the passerine bird Lanius ludovicianus
 Loggerheads or Centaurea, a genus of flowering plants
 Common knapweed or loggerheads (Centaurea nigra), a flowering plant
 Loggerhead sponge, a species of seaweed sponge

Media
 Loggerheads (2005 film), a film written and directed by Tim Kirkman
 Loggerheads (TV series), a popular 1997 German-made cartoon about Vikings, broadcast in different countries
 Loggerheads (1978 film), a film directed by Castellano & Pipolo
 Loggerheads (1993), an album by Canadian punk band D.O.A.
 Loggerheads (play), a 1925 play by Ralph Cullinan

Other
 Loggerhead (tool), two iron balls attached by an iron rod used by shipbuilders to melt pitch
 USS Loggerhead (SS-374), a Balao-class submarine launched in 1944
 Loggerheads, the heraldic term for leopards' faces on the coat of arms and flag of Shropshire
 Loggerhead turtle (disambiguation)
 

Animal common name disambiguation pages